Christoph Burkard (born 14 November 1983) is a retired German Paralympic swimmer who specialises in freestyle swimming and breaststroke and he competes in international level events. He is a four time World medalist, Paralympic champion and a European bronze medalist. He was born without his lower legs.

References

External links
 
 

1983 births
Living people
People from Rottweil
Sportspeople from Freiburg (region)
Paralympic swimmers of Germany
Swimmers at the 2000 Summer Paralympics
Swimmers at the 2004 Summer Paralympics
Swimmers at the 2008 Summer Paralympics
Swimmers at the 2012 Summer Paralympics
Swimmers at the 2016 Summer Paralympics
Medalists at the 2004 Summer Paralympics
Medalists at the 2012 Summer Paralympics
Medalists at the World Para Swimming Championships
Medalists at the World Para Swimming European Championships
German male breaststroke swimmers
German male freestyle swimmers
S8-classified Paralympic swimmers
21st-century German people